Marco Antonio Campos (9 September 1919 – 19 February 1996) was a Mexican comedian, actor, and singer best known as Viruta in the double act Viruta y Capulina with Gaspar Henaine. His best known role is as the straight man in the comic duo Viruta y Capulina along with Gaspar Henaine. Campos and Henaine worked together in 95 comedy films and one television series until they separated over work issues in 1969. He died in 1996 from an aortic aneurysm.

Selected filmography
 Comedians and Songs (1960)

Awards
 2005, Premio Casa de América de Poesía Americana

References

External links

Comedians from Mexico City
Male actors from Mexico City
Mexican male comedians
Mexican male film actors
Mexican male television actors
Golden Age of Mexican cinema
1919 births
1996 deaths
20th-century Mexican male actors
Deaths from aortic aneurysm
20th-century comedians